North Bend Lake is a  lake created through the Natural Resources Conservation Service via the Little Kanawha Conservation District.

References

Reservoirs in West Virginia
Bodies of water of Ritchie County, West Virginia